Lozna may refer to:

Settlements
 Lozna (Banovići), a village in Banovići, Bosnia and Herzegovina
 Lozna, Bijelo Polje, Montenegro
 Lozna, Botoșani, a commune in Botoşani County, Romania
 Lozna, Sălaj, a commune in Sălaj County, Romania
 Lozna (Trstenik), a village in Serbia

Streams
 Lozna (Rusca), a tributary of the Rusca in Caraș-Severin County, Romania
 Lozna (Someș), a tributary of the Someș in Sălaj County, Romania
 Lozna Mare, a source river of the Lozna in Caraș-Severin County, Romania
 Lozna Mică, a source river of the Lozna in Caraș-Severin County, Romania

See also
Liozna, a town in Belarus